Viktor Oleksandrovych Zvyahintsev (22 October 1950 – 22 April 2022) was a Ukrainian footballer who played as a defender. He was a member of the football congress of the unrecognised Donetsk People's Republic.

International career
Zvyahintsev made his debut for USSR on 12 October 1975 in a UEFA Euro 1976 qualifier against Switzerland (USSR did not qualify for the final tournament).

Personal life
His son-in-law is a football player and coach Viktor Onopko.

Honours
Shakhtar Donetsk
 Soviet Cup: 1980

USSR
 Olympic bronze: 1976

References

External links
 Profile on rusteam.permian.ru 
 

1950 births
2022 deaths
Ukrainian people of Russian descent
Sportspeople from Donetsk
Ukrainian footballers
Soviet footballers
Association football defenders
Soviet Union international footballers
FC Shakhtar Donetsk players
PFC CSKA Moscow players
FC Dynamo Kyiv players
SC Tavriya Simferopol players
Olympic footballers of the Soviet Union
Footballers at the 1976 Summer Olympics
People of the Donetsk People's Republic
Olympic bronze medalists for the Soviet Union
Olympic medalists in football
Pro-Russian people of the 2014 pro-Russian unrest in Ukraine
Pro-Russian people of the war in Donbas
Medalists at the 1976 Summer Olympics
Recipients of the Order of Merit (Ukraine), 3rd class
Ukrainian football referees
Ukrainian collaborators with Russia